Nungdiaw Sakcharuporn (born 14 May 1972) is a retired Thai professional boxer who held  the WBU light flyweight world champion in 1990s.

Biography and career
Sakcharuporn was born in Ban Dan Makham Tia, Kanchanaburi (currently being promoted as a Dan Makham Tia district), Kanchanaburi province. He used to Muay Thai under the name "Muangkan Buntasuwan" (เมืองกาญจน์ บันตะสุวรรณ) for 12 years before turning to the professional career. He made a total of nine wins before challenge WBF mini flyweight  with Ronnie "Toy Bulldog" Magramo, a Filipino title holder at the parking lot in front of Thansettakij building, Vibhavadi Rangsit road, Chatuchak district, Bangkok, the result was a losing by split decision in early 1995.

Later in middle of the same year. He has a chance to challenge the world title again with WBU light flyweight with Renardo Benonez, a Filipino boxer at Channel 7's studio, the result was that he was winning. Sakcharuporn defended his belt for three times, also beaten Josué Camacho from Puerto Rico too.

He was defeated by Mzukisi Sikali, a South African contender in late 1996 at Villa Café, Rama IX road, Huai Khwang district, Bangkok.

References

External links
 

Living people
1972 births
Light-flyweight boxers
Mini-flyweight boxers
Nungdiaw Sakcharuporn
Nungdiaw Sakcharuporn